Marine Aircraft Group 42 was a United States Marine Corps reserve aviation unit based at Naval Air Station Atlanta, Georgia.  Due to a re-organization within Marine aviation, MAG-42 was deactivated on 21 June 2008.

History
Marine Aircraft Group 42 (MAG-42) was initially activated on January 1, 1943, in San Diego, California, as ''Marine Base Defense Aircraft Group 42', 4th Marine Aircraft Wing. The unit mission was to provide air defense support for west coast Naval and Marine Corps installations and to conduct airborne search and patrol, transportation, air-sea rescue, and shipping escort operations along the Pacific Coast. By 1944, the unit expanded from a small complement of Marines and two T-6 aircraft to 272 officers, 2,135 enlisted, and 102 T-6 aircraft.

During 1943, the Group became responsible for training Marine aviators for World War II combat operations in the Pacific Theater and relocated to Goleta, California in January and then to Santa Barbara, California in March. In November 1944, the unit was re-designated Marine Aircraft Group 42. Following the war, MAG-42 was re-designated Marine Aircraft Support Group 42 and then deactivated on October 31, 1945.

MAG-42 was reactivated on February 1, 1965, during the Vietnam War. The Air Group consisted of Marine Attack Squadron 133 flying the A-4 Skyhawk and Marine Helicopter Transport Squadron 769 flying the H-34 helicopter. In 1971, Marine Helicopter Squadron 769 was redesignated to Marine Heavy Helicopter Squadron 769 and transitioned to the CH-53 Sea Stallion helicopter.
MAG-42 reserve unit was located in Millington, Tn.through the 1980's adjacent to NAS Millington Aviation Training

Following the collapse of the USSR, the stunning military success in the Persian Gulf War, and subsequent draw down of U.S. Department of Defense forces, the Department of the Navy developed a "Total Force" concept redefining the role of the Reserve Component to meet national emerging global security requirements. MAG-42 was reorganized and relocated to Marietta, Georgia on June 10, 1992, in support of the Marine Corps Total Force Concept, "the integration of active and reserve components into the Total Force, a cohesive team shaped for joint operations to meet national needs and global challenges." The reorganization resulted in a mirror image of Reserve and Active Marine Ground Task Force units and attachment of Marine Attack Helicopter Squadron 773 flying the AH-1J Cobra, Marine Observation Squadron 4 flying the OV-10D aircraft, Marine Light Helicopter Squadron 767 flying the UH-1N helicopter, Marine Medium Helicopter Squadron 774 flying the CH-46 helicopter, and Marine Fighter Attack Squadron 142 (VMFA-142) flying the F/A-18A Hornet.

On October 1, 1994, the Marine Light Attack and Marine Attack Squadrons was re-designated Marine Light Attack Squadron 773 (HMLA-773) at Atlanta and HMLA-773 Detachment A at New Orleans, LA. These combat tested units now reflect their counterparts in the Fleet Marine Force and combine the capabilities of the AH-1W Super Cobra Attack helicopter and the UH-1N Utility helicopter. This combat proven organization is now resident in the Reserve Force and underpins the Total Force Concept. In addition, VMFA-142 integrated the Department of the Navy TACAIR concept which integrates USMC and USN tactical jets into the Carrier Air Wing Group.

The total force-in-readiness mission is conducted by MAG-42 as a result of extensive training in many varied locations throughout the nation as well as deployments throughout the world. MAG-42 has participated in counter drug operations in several Eastern Caribbean countries in 1995 and 1996. Both marijuana eradication and drug-transit interdiction have accounted for more than $20 billion worth of illegal substances eradicated in these operations.

See also

 List of United States Marine Corps aircraft groups
 List of United States Marine Corps aircraft squadrons

References

External links
 MAG-42's Official Website

United States Marine Corps aircraft groups
Military units and formations in Georgia (U.S. state)
MAG-42